Beaulne is a French surname. Notable people with the surname include:

 Guy Beaulne, Canadian actor-director
 Joseph Charles Léonard Yvon Beaulne, Canadian diplomat
 Philippe Beaulne, Canadian diplomat

See also
 Vendresse-Beaulne, commune of the Ainse department of France

French-language surnames